Fakafifine are people from Niue, who were born assigned male at birth but who have a feminine gender expression. In Niue this is understood as a third gender, culturally specific to the country.

Etymology 
The term comes from Niuean and is composed of the prefix faka- (in the manner of) and the suffix -fifine (woman) and is defined in Niue Language Dictionary as 'to behave like a woman' or 'to be effeminate'. A related term is fakataane which means 'to behave like a man'.

Fakafifine is included in the acronym MVPFAFF+ (mahu, vakasalewalewa, palopa, fa'afafine, akava'ine, fakaleiti or leiti, fakafifine, and other), coined by Phylesha Brown-Acton, to "enhance Pasifika gender diversity awareness in addition to the term LGBTQI".

Notable fakafifine 

 Phylesha Brown-Acton (born 1976), human rights activist.

References 

 
Gender in Oceania
Gender systems
Niuean culture
Third gender
Society of Niue
Indigenous LGBT culture